The Mutual Life & Citizens Assurance Company Building (also known as Richard Ellis House or the MLC building) is a building located on the corner of Lambton Quay, Hunter Street and Featherston Street in Wellington, New Zealand.

The MLC building was completed in 1940 at a cost of £101,494 by W.M. Angus Ltd. for the, Australian-based insurance company, Mutual Life and Citizens Assurance Company. MLC operated its head office out of this building until 1985, when the New Zealand branch of the firm was taken over by New Zealand Insurance.

The clock on the building was installed in 1953 (3 months too late for celebrations for the Coronation of Queen Elizabeth II).

The building is classified as a "Category I" ("places of special or outstanding historical or cultural heritage significance or value") historic place by the New Zealand Historic Places Trust.

External links
 of MLC building ca. 1940, note lack of clock in original tower

References

Buildings and structures in Wellington City
Heritage New Zealand Category 1 historic places in the Wellington Region
Art Deco architecture in New Zealand
1940s architecture in New Zealand